FC Luch Vladivostok was an  association football club based in Vladivostok, Russia. In 2005, Luch won the Russian First Division and played in the Premier League from 2006 to 2008.

The club was called Luch-Energiya from 2003 to 2018, when it was renamed due to sponsorship from Dalenergo, an energy distribution company.

History
Luch has been playing in the Soviet Union championship since 1958. The name Luch means Ray. The club played in the Far East regional tournament of "B-class" teams and eventually won it in 1965, earning promotion to "A-class". Luch played in this regional tournament until league reorganization in 1972.

From 1972 to 1991, Luch played in the Eastern zone of Soviet Second League. The club's best result was a runner-up position in 1984.

In 1992, after the dissolution of Soviet Union, Luch was entitled to play in the Eastern zone of Russian First League and won that tournament. Luch played in Russian Top League in 1993 and was relegated, having finished 15th.

Luch played in Russian First Division from 1994 until relegation in 1997, and in Russian Second Division from 1998 to 2003. In 2003, Luch-Energia finished 1st in the Eastern zone and earned promotion. The club spent another 2 years in First Division, earning promotion to Premier League in 2005. In 2008 Luch finished in the last position and was relegated to the  Russian First Division. The club had some financial problems and were forced to sell some of their key players making the club vulnerable at home, formerly considered a fortress on the remote Pacific coast.

In November 2017, Luch's home game against Khimki was delayed by 15 minutes due to a protest by the club's players over delays in wages and the running of the club. Due to four months without pay some of the players had been evicted from their accommodation and a Luch supporters group supplying food to the players.

Despite finishing in the relegation zone at the end of the 2017–18 season, the club was not relegated as other clubs ahead in the standings failed to obtain the league license for 2018–19.

On 16 July 2018, the club was renamed back to FC Luch.

On 1 April 2020, the government of Primorsky Krai announced that all professional contracts with sports clubs in their region had been cancelled to provide funds to combat the spread the COVID-19 pandemic, with Luch Vladivostok dropping to the Russian Amateur Football League once football returns.

Domestic
{| class="wikitable mw-collapsible mw-collapsed" align=center cellspacing="0" cellpadding="3" style="border:1px solid #AAAAAA;font-size:90%"
|-bgcolor="#efefef"
! Season
! Div.
! Pos.
! Pl.
! W
! D
! L
! GS
! GA
! P
!Cup
!colspan=2|Europe
!Top Scorer (League)
!Head Coach
|-
|align=center|1992
|align=center|2nd, "East"
|align=center bgcolor="lightgreen"|1
|align=center|30
|align=center|20
|align=center|4
|align=center|6
|align=center|44
|align=center|14
|align=center|23
|align=center|—
|align=center colspan="2"|—
|align=left| Kasyanenko – 9 Dubovik – 9
|align=left| Burchalkin Ivchenko
|-
|align=center rowspan="2"|1993
|align=center|1st
|align=center|15
|align=center|34
|align=center|11
|align=center|7
|align=center|16
|align=center|29
|align=center|56
|align=center|29
|align=center rowspan="2"|R256
|align=center colspan="2" rowspan="2"|—
|align=left| Ruslyakov – 7
|align=left rowspan="2"| Ivchenko
|-
|align=center|Releg.tourn.
|align=center bgcolor="pink"|4
|align=center|5
|align=center|2
|align=center|2
|align=center|1
|align=center|11
|align=center|9
|align=center|6
|align=left| Galimov – 4
|-
|align=center|1994
|align=center rowspan="4"|2nd
|align=center|12
|align=center|42
|align=center|15
|align=center|11
|align=center|16
|align=center|44
|align=center|53
|align=center|41
|align=center|—
|align=center colspan="2"|—
|align=left| I. Protasov – 9
|align=left| Ig. Saenko
|-
|align=center|1995
|align=center|6
|align=center|42
|align=center|20
|align=center|6
|align=center|16
|align=center|51
|align=center|48
|align=center|66
|align=center|R256
|align=center colspan="2"|—
|align=left| Selenkov – 16
|align=left| Burchalkin
|-
|align=center|1996
|align=center|15
|align=center|42
|align=center|14
|align=center|12
|align=center|16
|align=center|39
|align=center|49
|align=center|54
|align=center|R128
|align=center colspan="2"|—
|align=left| Shkilov – 9
|align=left| Szekecs
|-
|align=center|1997
|align=center bgcolor="pink"|22
|align=center|42
|align=center|3
|align=center|12
|align=center|27
|align=center|23
|align=center|76
|align=center|21
|align=center|—
|align=center colspan="2"|—
|align=left| Selenkov – 5
|align=left| Kobersky
|-
|align=center|1998
|align=center rowspan="6"|3rd, "East"
|align=center|7
|align=center|30
|align=center|14
|align=center|6
|align=center|10
|align=center|42
|align=center|24
|align=center|48
|align=center|R64
|align=center colspan="2"|—
|align=left| Melnik – 8
|align=left| Fedyakin
|-
|align=center|1999
|align=center|7
|align=center|30
|align=center|14
|align=center|7
|align=center|9
|align=center|43
|align=center|32
|align=center|49
|align=center|R128
|align=center colspan="2"|—
|align=left| Melnik – 11
|align=left| Fedyakin
|-
|align=center|2000
|align=center|4
|align=center|24
|align=center|12
|align=center|3
|align=center|9
|align=center|41
|align=center|26
|align=center|39
|align=center|R512
|align=center colspan="2"|—
|align=left| Tikhonovetsky – 9
|align=left| Karamyan Zhuravlyov
|-
|align=center|2001
|align=center|8
|align=center|28
|align=center|9
|align=center|10
|align=center|9
|align=center|31
|align=center|29
|align=center|37
|align=center|R128
|align=center colspan="2"|—
|align=left| Tikhonovetsky – 8
|align=left| Lukyanov
|-
|align=center|2002
|align=center|6
|align=center|30
|align=center|15
|align=center|6
|align=center|9
|align=center|51
|align=center|34
|align=center|51
|align=center|R512
|align=center colspan="2"|—
|align=left| Kisurin – 10
|align=left| Tolkin Zhuravlyov
|-
|align=center|2003
|align=center bgcolor="lightgreen"|1
|align=center|24
|align=center|16
|align=center|4
|align=center|4
|align=center|53
|align=center|23
|align=center|52
|align=center|R512
|align=center colspan="2"|—
|align=left| A. Smirnov – 11
|align=left| Zhuravlyov  Antikhovich
|-
|align=center|2004
|align=center rowspan="2"|2nd
|align=center|14
|align=center|42
|align=center|15
|align=center|11
|align=center|16
|align=center|50
|align=center|50
|align=center|56
|align=center|R128
|align=center colspan="2"|—
|align=left| Sokolov – 11  Atangana – 11
|align=left| Antikhovich   Pavlov
|-
|align=center|2005
|align=center bgcolor="lightgreen"|1
|align=center|42
|align=center|27
|align=center|11
|align=center|4
|align=center|81
|align=center|32
|align=center|92
|align=center|R64
|align=center colspan="2"|—
|align=left| D.A. Smirnov – 19
|align=left| Pavlov
|-
|align=center|2006
|align=center rowspan="3"|1st
|align=center|7
|align=center|30
|align=center|12
|align=center|5
|align=center|13
|align=center|37
|align=center|39
|align=center|41
|align=center|R16
|align=center colspan="2"|—
|align=left| A. Ivanov – 5
|align=left| Pavlov
|-
|align=center|2007
|align=center|14
|align=center|30
|align=center|8
|align=center|8
|align=center|14
|align=center|26
|align=center|38
|align=center|32
|align=center|R32
|align=center colspan="2"|—
|align=left| Strelkov – 5
|align=left| Pavlov
|-
|align=center|2008
|align=center bgcolor="pink"|16
|align=center|30
|align=center|3
|align=center|12
|align=center|15
|align=center|24
|align=center|53
|align=center|21
|align=center|R32
|align=center colspan="2"|—
|align=left| Bulyga – 5 I. Shevchenko – 5
|align=left| Vulić  Altman
|-
|align=center|2009
|align=center rowspan="3"|2nd
|align=center|14
|align=center|38
|align=center|13
|align=center|11
|align=center|14
|align=center|42
|align=center|43
|align=center|50
|align=center|R32
|align=center colspan="2"|—
|align=left| Dedechko – 9
|align=left| Yemelyanov  Pobegalov
|-
|align=center|2010
|align=center|12
|align=center|38
|align=center|13
|align=center|13
|align=center|12
|align=center|42
|align=center|42
|align=center|52
|align=center|QF
|align=center colspan="2"|—
|align=left| Satalkin – 9
|align=left| Nazarenko   Arcos
|-
|align=center|2011–12
|align=center bgcolor="pink"|17
|align=center|48
|align=center|11
|align=center|21
|align=center|16
|align=center|37
|align=center|39
|align=center|54
|align=center|R16
|align=center colspan="2"|—
|align=left| Alkhazov – 10
|align=left| Arcos Pavlov
|-
|align=center|2012–13
|align=center|3rd, "East"
|align=center bgcolor="lightgreen"|1
|align=center|30
|align=center|18
|align=center|8
|align=center|4
|align=center|48
|align=center|27
|align=center|62
|align=center|R2
|align=center colspan="2"|—
|align=left| Tikhonovetsky – 14
|align=left| Yemelyanov
|-
|align=center|2013–14
|align=center rowspan="7"|2nd
|align=center|8
|align=center|36
|align=center|15
|align=center|10
|align=center|11
|align=center|40
|align=center|25
|align=center|55
|align=center|SF
|align=center colspan="2"|—
|align=left| Asildarov – 5   Mikhalyov −5
|align=left| Yemelyanov   Grigoryan
|-
|align=center|2014–15
|align=center|10
|align=center|34
|align=center|11
|align=center|9
|align=center|14
|align=center|40
|align=center|46
|align=center|42
|align=center|R32
|align=center colspan="2"|—
|align=left| Myazin −11
|align=left| Grigoryan   Ushahin
|-
|align=center|2015–16
|align=center|15
|align=center|38
|align=center|12
|align=center|9
|align=center|17
|align=center|31
|align=center|46
|align=center|45
|align=center|R4
|align=center colspan="2"|—
|align=left| Nivaldo −6
|align=left| Veretennikov   Perednya
|-
|align=center|2016–17
|align=center|16
|align=center|38
|align=center|9
|align=center|15
|align=center|14
|align=center|27
|align=center|41
|align=center|42
|align=center|R4
|align=center colspan="2"|—
|align=left| Stolbovoy −5
|align=left| Perednya
|-
|align=center|2017–18
|align=center|18
|align=center|38
|align=center|9
|align=center|13
|align=center|16
|align=center|40
|align=center|52
|align=center|40
|align=center|QF
|align=center colspan="2"|—
|align=left| Geloyan −7   Myazin −7 
|align=left| Ivanauskas   Grigoryan
|-
|align=center|2018–19
|align=center|13
|align=center|38
|align=center|10
|align=center|17
|align=center|11
|align=center|29
|align=center|28
|align=center|47
|align=center|R64
|align=center colspan="2"|—
|align=left| Pavlenko −4   Khleborodov −4   Viznovich −4 
|align=left| Khuzin
|-
|align=center|2019–20
|align=center bgcolor="pink"|16
|align=center|27
|align=center|6
|align=center|9
|align=center|12
|align=center|28
|align=center|40
|align=center|27
|align=center|R16
|align=center colspan="2"|—
|align=left| Aliyev −8 
|align=left| Khuzin   Ushakhin    Petrakov
|}

Complications
Situated in the Far East of the country, their location poses a significant problem for away teams, for example being 9 hours by flight from Moscow. When playing FC Zenit Saint Petersburg at home, a trio of Zenit fans drove 15,000 km across the country only for their car to break down when in Vladivostok, leaving them unable to drive home. These fans thus took the Trans-Siberian Railway back to Saint Petersburg, upon which the club rewarded them with a new car on 1 October 2006.

There has been much controversy about whether the Russian league should be split into Western and Eastern leagues; however, this is yet to happen. Igor Akinfeev said "They should join football league in Japan." after CSKA Moscow lost 0–4 away from home against Vladivostok on 10 June 2007. In addition to this, even their own players admitted it was awkward as they had to travel long distances for away games. Matija Kristić said "It's not as bad for other teams because they only need to travel this distance once a year whereas we have to do it for all away matches". Srđan Radonjić said "It is just crazy, they should have two Russian premier leagues, one for the European teams and another for Asian teams. Vladivostok is 4,000 miles from Moscow."

Notable players
Had international caps for their respective countries. Players whose name is listed in bold represented their countries while playing for Luch-Energiya.

USSR/Russia

Former USSR countries

Europe

Africa

References

External links
 Official website

 
Association football clubs established in 1958
Luch Vladivostok
Luch Vladivostok
1958 establishments in Russia